John DiGiorgio (born June 29, 1982) is a retired American football linebacker. He was signed by the Buffalo Bills as an undrafted free agent in 2006. He played college football at Saginaw Valley State.

Professional career

Buffalo Bills
DiGiorgio was signed by the Bills as an undrafted free agent in 2006. That year, he was the only undrafted free agent to make the Bills' 53-man roster. He overcame a lot of adversity, and added depth to a (during the time) weak defense.
As a rookie in 2006, DiGiorgio played in 12 games and made eight tackles. But when London Fletcher departed for Washington after the season, it gave DiGiorgio a chance to compete for the starting job.

DiGiorgio had a big year for the Bills in 2007. He played in all 16 games—the final 13 as a starter at middle linebacker—and was second on the team with 113 tackles. John took full advantage of Paul Posluszny's injury, and filled in as the middle linebacker in the 2007 season. As John filled in for the injured starting linebacker he did an exceptional job. His "blue-collar" work-ethics made him the 2007 Buffalo fan favorite. With Buffalo being a predominate blue-collared environment the fans took notice of John being a natural underdog in the NFL with a great work-ethic. The combination of hard-work and Buffalo natives recognizing his background, adversities, and doing an exceptional job as the backup MLB sparked the Buffalo fans support. He also had two fumble recoveries and an interception. The Bills were in the playoff hunt late in the season, but they lost their final three games to finish with a 7-9 record.

Among DiGiorgio's highlights was his sack of New England Patriots' quarterback Tom Brady in Week 3 for his first career sack. He also intercepted a pass from Tony Romo in a 25-24 loss to the Dallas Cowboys. However, the following season, DiGiorgio appeared in six games primarily on special teams before tearing a ligament in his right knee while blocking on a punt return in the second quarter of a 23-14 win over San Diego in Week 7.

He was waived by the Buffalo Bills on July 25, 2009 for failing his physical after having season-ending surgery to repair bone damage in his right knee.

He retired on July 25, 2010.

Personal
DiGiorgio is an Italian-American.

DiGiorgio prepped at Eisenhower High School in Shelby Township, Michigan.

He then pursued his teaching degree and teaching certification at Saginaw Valley State University, stating that "(NFL) stands for 'Not For Long' -- instead of the National Football League -- because careers don't last long in the NFL. John DiGiorgio was a student teacher at Siebert Elementary School in Midland. DiGiorgio, a former All-American at Saginaw Valley State University, helped out Bob Wellman in his physical education classes. He also delivered big hits that drew fans to create catch phrase for his incredibly astonishing, punishing, blows delivered to opposing players: "It's not delivery, it's Digiorgio!"  During the 2008 off-season, DiGiorgio began to student-teach physical education at Siebert Elementary in Midland, Michigan.

In July 2010 he accepted a job teaching Physical Education and coaching at Chippewa Valley High School in Clinton Township, Michigan.
During the summer of 2014, John returned to his old team at Eisenhower High School, where he served as the Eagles' offensive coordinator.

References

External links
Buffalo Bills bio

1982 births
Living people
American people of Italian descent
People from Macomb County, Michigan
Sportspeople from Metro Detroit
Players of American football from Michigan
American football linebackers
Saginaw Valley State Cardinals football players
Buffalo Bills players
Coaches of American football from Michigan
High school football coaches in Michigan